The Ludington Light is a  tall steel-plated lighthouse in Ludington, Michigan, which lies along the eastern shores of Lake Michigan, at the end of the breakwater on the Pere Marquette Harbor.  Given its location on the northern breakwater where the Pere Marquette River meets Lake Michigan, it is sometimes known as the Ludington North Breakwater Light.  Underlying the building itself is a prow-like structure, which is designed to break waves.

History
The station was established in 1871.  This light was first lit in 1924, and it is presently operational.  It was automated in 1972.  The light is structurally integrated into the steel and reinforced concrete pier upon which it is built. It has a square pyramidal form, and is white with a black lantern.  The original lens was a Fourth Order Fresnel lens.  On October 17, 1995 the Fresnel lens was removed from the lantern.  It was replaced by a  Tideland Signal ML-300 acrylic optic. The original lens was loaned to Historic White Pine Village where it is displayed as part of their maritime history exhibit.

A fog signal building is integrated into the tower.  It originally had a Type F Diaphone signal, and a FA-232 is now in operation.  A radio beacon is also in  place and operational.

In 2006, the Ludington Breakwater Lighthouse was opened to the public for the first time in its history. The Coast Guard transferred ownership to the City of Ludington under the terms of the National Historic Lighthouse Preservation Act.  The lighthouse is being operated and maintained in partnership with the Sable Points Lighthouse Keepers Association, which is a volunteer group that maintains, restores and operates this light, the Big Sable Point Lighthouse and the Little Sable Point Lighthouse.

The lighthouse is open to the public during the summer season for climbing tours.

See also
Lighthouses in the United States

References

Further reading

 Bibliography on Michigan lighthouses.
 Crompton, Samuel Willard  & Michael J. Rhein, The Ultimate Book of Lighthouses (2002) ; .
 Hyde, Charles K., and Ann and John Mahan. The Northern Lights: Lighthouses of the Upper Great Lakes.  Detroit: Wayne State University Press, 1995.    .
 Jones, Ray & Bruce Roberts, American Lighthouses (Globe Pequot, September 1, 1998, 1st Ed.) ; .
 Jones, Ray,The Lighthouse Encyclopedia, The Definitive Reference (Globe Pequot, January 1, 2004, 1st ed.) ; .
 Noble, Dennis, Lighthouses & Keepers: U. S. Lighthouse Service and Its Legacy (Annapolis: U. S. Naval Institute Press, 1997). ; .
 Oleszewski, Wes, Great Lakes Lighthouses, American and Canadian: A Comprehensive Directory/Guide to Great Lakes Lighthouses, (Gwinn, Michigan: Avery Color Studios, Inc., 1998) .
 Penrod, John, Lighthouses of Michigan, (Berrien Center, Michigan: Penrod/Hiawatha, 1998)  .
 
 Putnam, George R., Lighthouses and Lightships of the United States, (Boston: Houghton Mifflin Co., 1933).
 United States Coast Guard, Aids to Navigation, (Washington, DC: U. S. Government Printing Office, 1945).
 
 
 Wagner, John L., Michigan Lighthouses: An Aerial Photographic Perspective, (East Lansing, Michigan: John L. Wagner, 1998)  .
 Wargin, Ed, Legends of Light: A Michigan Lighthouse Portfolio (Ann Arbor Media Group, 2006).  .
 Wright, Larry and Wright, Patricia, Great Lakes Lighthouses Encyclopedia Hardback (Erin: Boston Mills Press, 2006) 

Lighthouses completed in 1871
Lighthouses completed in 1924
Lighthouses on the National Register of Historic Places in Michigan
National Register of Historic Places in Mason County, Michigan